The large bird genus Columba comprises a group of medium to large pigeons. The terms "dove" and "pigeon" are used indiscriminately for smaller and larger Columbidae, respectively. Columba species – at least those of Columba sensu stricto – are generally termed "pigeons", and in many cases wood-pigeons. The rock dove (C. livia), has given rise to the majority of domesticated pigeon breeds, such as the racing pigeon and the fantail pigeon some of which have become feral. Meanwhile, "wood pigeon" by itself usually means the common wood pigeon (C. palumbus).

This genus as understood today is native to the Old World, but some – notably the domestic and feral rock pigeon – have been introduced outside their natural range, for example in the Americas.

Etymology
The term columba comes from the Latin columba, "a dove", the feminine form of columbus, "a male dove", itself the latinisation of the Greek κόλυμβος (kolumbos), "diver", which derives from the verb κολυμβάω (kolumbaō), "to dive, plunge headlong, swim". The feminine form of kolumbos, κολυμβίς (kolumbis), "diver", was the name applied by Aristophanes and others  to the common rock pigeons of Greece, because of the "swimming" motion made by their wings when flying.

Taxonomy
The genus Columba was introduced by the Swedish naturalist Carl Linnaeus in 1758 in the tenth edition of his Systema Naturae. The type species was designated as the stock dove (Columba oenas) by Irish zoologist Nicholas Aylward Vigors in 1825.

The American pigeons formerly in Columba are now split off as a separate genus Patagioenas again. That the American radiation constitutes a distinct lineage is borne out by molecular evidence; in fact, the Patagioenas "pigeons" are basal to the split between the Columba "pigeons" and the Streptopelia "doves". The typical pigeons together with Streptopelia and the minor Nesoenas and Stigmatopelia lineages constitute the dominant evolutionary radiation of Columbidae in temperate Eurasia, though they also occur in tropical regions. The taxonomic status of some African pigeons presently placed here is in need of further study; they are smaller than the usual Columba (and hence often called "doves"), and differ in some other aspects. They might be separable as genus Aplopelia. That notwithstanding, the lineage of the typical pigeons probably diverged from its closest relatives in the Late Miocene, perhaps some 7-8 million years ago (Ma).

Species

There are 35 species recognised in the genus, of which two are extinct:
 Rock dove, Columba livia
 Hill pigeon, Columba rupestris
 Snow pigeon, Columba leuconota
 Speckled pigeon, Columba guinea
 White-collared pigeon, Columba albitorques
 Stock dove, Columba oenas
 Yellow-eyed pigeon, Columba eversmanni
 Somali pigeon, Columba oliviae
 Common wood pigeon or wood pigeon, Columba palumbus
 Trocaz pigeon, Columba trocaz
 Bolle's pigeon, Columba bollii
 Laurel pigeon, Columba junoniae
 Afep pigeon, Columba unicincta
 African olive pigeon, Columba arquatrix
 Cameroon olive pigeon, Columba sjostedti
 São Tomé olive pigeon, Columba thomensis
 Comoros olive pigeon, Columba polleni
 Speckled wood pigeon, Columba hodgsonii
 White-naped pigeon, Columba albinucha
 Ashy wood pigeon, Columba pulchricollis
 Nilgiri wood pigeon, Columba elphinstonii
 Sri Lanka wood pigeon, Columba torringtoniae
 Pale-capped pigeon, Columba punicea
 Silvery pigeon, Columba argentina – (thought to be extinct, rediscovered in 2008)
 Andaman wood pigeon, Columba palumboides
 Japanese wood pigeon, Columba janthina
 † Bonin wood pigeon,  Columba versicolor – extinct (c. 1890)
 † Ryukyu wood pigeon, Columba jouyi – extinct (late 1930s)
 Metallic pigeon or white-throated pigeon, Columba vitiensis
 White-headed pigeon, Columba leucomela
 Yellow-legged pigeon, Columba pallidiceps
 Eastern bronze-naped pigeon, Columba delegorguei
 Western bronze-naped pigeon, Columba iriditorques
 Island bronze-naped pigeon, Columba malherbii
 Lemon dove, Columba larvata – sometimes placed in Aplopelia

A fossil species, C. omnisanctorum, was described from the Early Pliocene (5.3-3.6 Ma) of the Gargano Peninsula and surroundings, Italy. A supposed "falcon" fossil from nearby contemporary and Middle Pliocene (3.6-2.6 Ma) sites may either be of the same species or another pigeon; the name Columba pisana would apply for it or (if conspecific) for both. C. melitensis is a fossil pigeon from the Late Pleistocene of Malta. Only known from a coracoid described by Richard Lydekker in 1891, whether it is indeed distinct from the living species and not just a paleosubspecies needs to be studied, given its late age. Indeterminate remains of a Columba were also found in Late Pliocene/Early Pleistocene (ELMMZ MN 17) deposits at Varshets (Bulgaria) and Šandalja (Croatia).

Another prehistoric pigeon, C. congi, was described from Early Pleistocene remains found in the famous Zhoukoudian caves in China. This, too, needs to be studied regarding whether it is not just an ancestral population of a still-living species. An extinct pigeon, the Mauritian wood pigeon (Columba thiriouxi), was described in 2011. The validity of the species has been challenged and it is not generally recognised. The holotype is a right tarsometatarsus collected in 1910.

References

Sources
 Mlíkovský, Jirí (2002): Cenozoic Birds of the World, Part 1: Europe. Ninox Press, Prague.  PDF fulltext

 
Bird genera
Taxa named by Carl Linnaeus